ψ Cygni, Latinised as Psi Cygni, is a triple star system in the constellation called Cygnus. With a combined apparent visual magnitude of 4.92, it is visible to the naked eye. As of 2002, the inner pair, components Aa and Ab, had an angular separation of 0.10 arc seconds along a position angle of 77.6°. Their combined visual magnitude is 5.05. Relative to this pair, the third member of the system, magnitude 7.61 component B, had an angular separation of 2.87 arc seconds along a position angle of 175.6° as of 2010. Based upon an annual parallax shift of 11.59 mas, Psi Cygni is located around 281 light years from the Sun.

The brighter member of the system, presumably component Aa, displays the spectrum of an A-type main sequence star with a stellar classification of A4 Vn, where the 'n' notation indicates "nebulous" absorption lines due to rapid rotation. It appears to be a spinning with a projected rotational velocity of 207. The component is radiating 62 times the solar luminosity from its outer atmosphere at an effective temperature of 7,971 K.

References

A-type main-sequence stars
F-type main-sequence stars
Triple star systems
Cygnus (constellation)
Cygni, Psi
Cygni, 24
189037
098055
7619
Durchmusterung objects